Carlos Roberto de Lima or simply Carlos Roberto (born 28 January 1980 in Londrina) is a former Brazilian football player.

He played his only game in the Russian Football Premier League for FC Rostov on 27 September 2003 against PFC CSKA Moscow.

References

External links
 

1980 births
Sportspeople from Londrina
Living people
Brazilian footballers
Londrina Esporte Clube players
FC Rostov players
Russian Premier League players
Brazilian expatriate footballers
Expatriate footballers in Russia
Association football forwards